Milford West is the name of an electoral ward in Pembrokeshire, Wales. It covers the area of the town of Milford Haven immediately east of Milford Haven railway station and Hubberston Pill.

The ward elects a county councillor to Pembrokeshire County Council and three town councillors to Milford Haven Town Council.

According to the 2011 UK Census the population of the ward was 2,254 (with 1,709 being of voting age).

County elections
At the May 2017 county election the sitting Plaid Cymru councillor Rhys Sinnett retained his seat.

* = sitting councillor prior to the election

See also
 Milford Central
 Milford Hakin
 List of electoral wards in Pembrokeshire

References

Pembrokeshire electoral wards
Milford Haven